Bislett is a neighbourhood in the St. Hanshaugen borough in north-central Oslo, Norway. It is internationally famous for the Bislett Games, held at Bislett Stadium.

Bislett has also become known to non-Norwegians due to being the home of the fictional detective Harry Hole, whose exploits have been translated into numerous languages. 

Neighbourhoods of Oslo